Simplocariini is a tribe of pill beetles in the family Byrrhidae. There are about 9 genera and more than 40 described species in Simplocariini.

Genera
These nine genera belong to the tribe Simplocariini:
 Chrysosimplocaria Paulus, 1982
 Exomella Casey, 1914
 Himalayoligus Fabbri, 2002
 Horiella Tazikawa, 1983
 Lasiomorychus Ganglbauer, 1902
 Lioligus Casey, 1912
 Lioon Casey, 1912
 Simplocaria Stephens, 1829
 Trichobyrrhulus Ganglbauer, 1902

References

Byrrhidae